The 21st Metro Manila Film Festival was held in 1995.

Viva Films' Muling Umawit ang Puso romped away with eleven awards including the Best Picture, Best Actress for multi-awarded Nora Aunor, Best Director for Joel Lamangan, and the Gatpuno Antonio J. Villegas Cultural Awards among others. In addition, first-time awardee Richard Gomez went home with the Best Actor Award for the movie Dahas.

Entries

Winners and nominees

Awards
Winners are listed first and highlighted in boldface.

Special Categories
Winners are listed first and highlighted in boldface.

Multiple awards

References

External links

Metro Manila Film Festival
MMFF
MMFF